Binaramalee is a 1969 Sri Lankan Sinhala drama thriller film directed and produced by Mudalinayaka Somaratne as his maiden directorial venture. It stars Swarna Kahawita and Wickrama Bogoda in lead roles along with Piyadasa Gunasekera, Shanthi Lekha and D. R. Nanayakkara with supportive roles. Music composed by Somadasa Elvitigala.

It is the 200th Sri Lankan film in the Sinhala cinema. It is the first Sri Lanka film based on a radio drama, which was made by director himself as a radio drama Muwan Palessa.

The film received critically acclaim and became a blockbuster of that year. The film received several awards at 1970 Sarasaviya Awards ceremony including, Best Film, Best Actress and Best Director.

Plot

Cast
 Swarna Kahawita as Binaramali 
 Wickrama Bogoda as Sinno
 Piyadasa Gunasekera as Veddikaraya
 D. R. Nanayakkara as Arachchila
 Mudalinayaka Somaratne as Sudu Banda
 Shanthi Lekha as Kiri Amma 
 Gemunu Wijesuriya as Ranhamy
 Sumana Amarasinghe as Sobani
 Dharma Sri Munasinghe as Guru Hamy
 Kingsley Dissanayake as Golu Banda
 Cyril Wickramage as Singer
 Wijeratne Warakagoda as Heen Banda
 A. P. Gunaratne as Dandoniye Rala
 Devika Karunaratne
 Annesley Dias as Loku Appuhamy
 Samuel Rodrigo
 Berty Gunathilake

Awards

1970 Sarasaviya Awards

References

1969 films
1960s Sinhala-language films
Sri Lankan drama films
1969 drama films